Bacchisa bicoloripennis is a species of beetle in the family Cerambycidae. It was described by Breuning in 1968. It is known from Laos.

References

Bacchisa
Beetles described in 1968
Beetles of Asia